Bonnie Bears: Homeward Journey is a 2013 Chinese animated TV film adventure family drama film based on the animated television series Boonie Bears. The first film Boonie Bears: To the Rescue was released after the TV film in 2014.

Plot 
It was nearly New Year's eve and the animals in the forest were preparing decorations for the Chinese New Year, Vick also realised that it was almost Chinese New Year when he received a call from his parents. He tried to cut down some old trees for Mr. Li, who is his economy supporter, in order to get enough money, but his plans were foiled by the Briar, Bramble, and the other animals again. The animals soon starts to feel bad for Vick when they realized that he was trying to get home for the Chinese New Year, and
constructed a truck from the broken logging machine made by Vick earlier when he was trying to cut down the old trees. The other animals were all supposed to stay in the forest when the Bears get Vick home with the truck, but Tiki and Babu sneaked onto the truck. But Vick woke up when they're nearly at the railway station and ran away since he thought that the bears were trying to send him somewhere away from the forest to prevent him from cutting down trees. The bears eventually chased Vick to the railway station, Vick saw the railway station and try to get in, but thrown out by the guard since he doesn't have money to buy a ticket. Vick successfully sneaked into the railway station, didn't notice that the bears secretly helped him to get in. Soon the train came, Vick tried to sneak into the cabin which was used the store the people's belongings, but captured by the guards, with no other option, the bears tore off their human clothes and distracted the guards, Vick quickly sneaked in. Peaking through a tiny gap in the doors, Vick discovered that the bears were about to be send to a testing facility, he saved the bears as the train just drove away. Luckily, the bears successfully got Vick onto the luggage cabin in the train using a 2-person railway handcar, And Vick finally got home for Chinese New Year.

Reception 
The film was shown at the Italian Contemporary Film Festival.

The film received reviews from sources including The Dove Foundation and Common Sense Media.

References

Animated drama films
Animated adventure films
Animated comedy films
Chinese animated films
Chinese television films
Animated films based on animated series
Boonie Bears films
2013 films